The 1969 Mr. Olympia contest was an IFBB professional bodybuilding competition held in September  1969 at the Brooklyn Academy of Music in Brooklyn, New York.  It was the 5th Mr. Olympia competition held.

Results

Notable events
 Sergio Oliva won his third consecutive title
 Arnold Schwarzenegger was defeated for the only time on a Mr. Olympia stage

References

External links 
 Mr. Olympia

 1969
Mr. Olympia
Mr. Olympia
Mr. Olympia